The 2021 COSAFA Cup was the 20th edition of the COSAFA Cup, an international football competition consisting of national teams of member nations of the Council of Southern Africa Football Associations (COSAFA). It took place on 6–18 July 2021.

Zambia is the defending champion, having defeated Botswana, 1–0, in the previous edition's final on 8 June 2019.

Participating nations

Venue
Matches will held at the Nelson Mandela Bay Stadium and Wolfson Stadium in Port Elizabeth, South Africa.

Draw
The draw for the 2021 COSAFA Cup was staged in host city Nelson Mandela Bay on Thursday, June 17, 2021.

Grouping line

Match officials

Referees
Abongile Tom (South Africa)
Brighton Chimene (Zimbabwe)
Antonio Caluassi Dungula (Angola)
Eldrick Adelaide (Seychelles)
Akhona Makalima (South Africa)
Thulani Sibandze (Eswatini)
Wilson Julio Muianga (Mozambique)
Keabetswe Dintwa (Botswana)
Osiase Koto (Lesotho)
Audrick Nkole (Zambia)

Assistant Referees
Diana Chikotesha (Zambia)
Brighton Nyika (Zimbabwe)
Petros Mzi Mbingo (Eswatini)
Moses Singeve (Namibia)
Lucky Kegakologetswe (Botswana)
Siza Dlangamandla (Lesotho)
Joseph Nyauti (Malawi)
Ivanildo Meirelles Lopes (Angola)

Group stages

Tiebreakers
Teams are ranked according to points (3 points for a win, 1 point for a draw, 0 points for a loss), and if tied on points, the following tiebreaking criteria are applied, in the order given, to determine the rankings (Regulations Article 9.3)
Points in head-to-head matches among tied teams;
Goal difference in head-to-head matches among tied teams;
Goals scored in head-to-head matches among tied teams;
If more than two teams are tied, and after applying all head-to-head criteria above, a subset of teams are still tied, all head-to-head criteria above are reapplied exclusively to this subset of teams;
Goal difference in all group matches;
Goals scored in all group matches;
Penalty shoot-out if only two teams are tied and they met in the last round of the group;
Disciplinary points (yellow card = 1 point, red card as a result of two yellow cards = 3 points, direct red card = 3 points, yellow card followed by direct red card = 4 points);
Drawing of lots.

All matches will be held at Port Elizabeth
Time listed are UTC+2:00

Group A

Group B

Knockout stage
In the knockout stage, extra-time and a penalty shoot-out will be used to decide the winner if necessary.

Bracket

Semi-finals

Third place match

Final

Statistics

Goalscorers

References

External links
Official site

2021
2021 in African football
International association football competitions hosted by South Africa